KBAM (1400 kHz) is an AM radio station broadcasting a country music format. Licensed to Longview, Washington, United States, the station is currently owned by Bicoastal Media, LLC and features programming from Compass Media Networks.

History
KBAM signed on in 1938, on 780 kHz, as KWLK. It moved to 1370 kHz in 1940, then to 1400 kHz in 1941, as a result of the NARBA agreement. The station changed its call sign to KEDO on November 10, 1958. On September 6, 2010, KEDO changed its format from oldies to talk.

On September 2, 2021, the KEDO call sign and the talk/sports format moved to 1270 AM Longview, swapping frequencies and call signs with country-formatted KBAM, which moved to 1400 AM.

Previous logo
 (KBAM's logo as KEDO under previous oldies format)

References

External links

FCC History Cards for KBAM

BAM
Cowlitz County, Washington
Longview, Washington
Country radio stations in the United States
Radio stations established in 1938
1938 establishments in Washington (state)